Stephen Carriere (born June 15, 1989) is an American former competitive figure skater. He is the 2007 World Junior champion, 2006 JGP Final champion, and 2008 U.S. national bronze medalist. During his career, he has won two Grand Prix medals, one Challenger Series medal, and four other senior international medals.

Personal life 
Carriere was born in Melrose, Massachusetts. He graduated from Wakefield High School in 2007. In 2007, he began attending Boston College part-time, where he is a corporate business major.

Carriere graduated from the Carroll School of Management at Boston College with a degree in marketing and management in 2015.

His cousin, Caroline Hallisey, is a short track speed skater and a three-time Olympian.

Career 
From 2000 through 2009, Carriere trained at the Skating Club of Boston and was coached by Mark Mitchell and Peter Johansson.

Carriere won the pewter medal at the novice level of the 2004 U.S. Championships. The following season, 2004–2005, he made his junior debut. He placed 5th at his first Junior Grand Prix assignment but was not given a second one. That year, he placed 7th at 2005 U.S. Championships on the junior level.

In the 2005–2006 season, Carriere won a gold and a silver medal on the Junior Grand Prix and then placed 6th at the Final. He moved up at Nationals and won the junior gold medal. This earned him a trip to the World Junior Championships, where he placed just off the podium.

In 2006–2007, he won everything on the Junior level, including both his Junior Grand Prix assignments and the 2006 ISU Junior Grand Prix Final. After placing ninth in his senior national debut, Carriere was named to the 2007 Junior Worlds team. At Junior Worlds, after placing sixth in the short program, he won the free skate, pulling up to win the event overall.

Carriere made his senior Grand Prix debut at the 2007 Skate America, where he placed 4th. At his second Grand Prix event, the 2007 NHK Trophy, he won the bronze medal. He also won the bronze medal at nationals and finished 10th in his first appearance at senior Worlds.

In the 2008-2009 Grand Prix season, Carriere competed at the Cup of China and the NHK Trophy, winning the silver medal in China and placing 6th in Japan. In January 2009, he was involved in a car accident but was unharmed. He placed 9th at the 2009 U.S. Championships. Following the 2008–09 season, Carriere changed coaches to Priscilla Hill and Karl Kurtz.

Carriere missed the 2010 and 2011 U.S. Championships due to recurring tendonitis and a right ankle infection.

On June 10, 2015, Carriere announced his retirement from competitive figure skating.

Programs

Competitive highlights 
GP: Grand Prix; CS: Challenger Series (began in the 2014–15 season); JGP: Junior Grand Prix

References

External links 

 
 Stephen Carriere at IceNetwork
 

American male single skaters
People from Melrose, Massachusetts
People from Wakefield, Massachusetts
Sportspeople from Middlesex County, Massachusetts
1989 births
Living people
World Junior Figure Skating Championships medalists